List of records for the Australian rugby league team that played under the names; Gold Coast-Tweed Giants, Gold Coast Seagulls, and finally Gold Coast Chargers. The side competed from 1988 to 1998.

Club Records

Biggest Wins

Biggest Losses

Longest Winning Streak
 3 Matches June 7, 1997 - July 5, 1997

Longest Losing Streak
 16 Matches April 25, 1993 - August 28, 1993

Player Records

Most games

Most career points

Most tries in a match

Most goals in a match

Most points in a match

Most tries in a season

Most points in a season

References 

Records
National Rugby League lists
Gold Coast, Queensland-related lists
Australian records
Rugby league records and statistics